Xu Dongxiang (born 15 January 1983 in Hangzhou) is a female Chinese rower, who competed for Team China at the 2008 Summer Olympics and 2012 Summer Olympics, where she and team-mate Huang Wenyi won the silver medal in the women's lightweight double sculls.

Major performances
 2002 Asian Games – 1st LW2X;
 2004 Olympic Games – 5th LW2X;
 2005 National Games – 1st LW2X/LW4X;
 2006 World Championships – 1st LW2X;
 2006 Asian Games – 1st lightweight single sculls;
 2006 World Cup Leg 1/2 – 1st LW2X;
 2007 World Cup Leg 2 – 2nd LW2X

Records
 2006 World Cup Poznan – 6:49.77 (World Best)

References

External links
 2008teamchina
 
 

1983 births
Living people
Chinese female rowers
Olympic rowers of China
Sportspeople from Hangzhou
Rowers at the 2004 Summer Olympics
Rowers at the 2008 Summer Olympics
Rowers at the 2012 Summer Olympics
Asian Games medalists in rowing
Olympic silver medalists for China
Olympic medalists in rowing
Medalists at the 2012 Summer Olympics
Rowers at the 2002 Asian Games
World Rowing Championships medalists for China
Rowers at the 2006 Asian Games
Asian Games gold medalists for China
Medalists at the 2002 Asian Games
Medalists at the 2006 Asian Games
Rowers from Zhejiang
20th-century Chinese women
21st-century Chinese women